Ricco Ross is an American actor.

Life and career
Born at Cook County Hospital in Chicago, Illinois, he is the fifth of eight children, and in addition has three step sisters and another brother from his father's first marriage. He first acted in a high school production, majored in theater at a local community college, and entered Florida Atlantic University (FAU), where he was awarded a BA in Theater. He earned a scholarship to UCLA, where his career started to develop.

Ross' first television role was as an extra on The Young and the Restless, which was followed by a small part in Hill Street Blues and the male lead in the music video for Whitney Houston's 1985 hit song "Saving All My Love for You".  He later played Private Ricco Frost in the film Aliens (1986), and also appeared in the films Death Wish 3 (1985), Spies Like Us (1985), The Dirty Dozen: Next Mission (1985 TV film), "Displaced Person" (1985 episode of American Playhouse), Gulliver's Travels (1996), Mission Impossible (1996), Fierce Creatures (1997), Nate and the Colonel (2003) and Hydra (2009).

From the late 1980s to the early 1990s, he lived and worked in the United Kingdom.  While there, he made guest appearances in Doctor Who (in the 1988 serial The Greatest Show in the Galaxy) and Jeeves and Wooster, and played a supporting role as CIA agent Karl Richfield in the 1991 mini-series Sleepers.

Ross now appears in various commercials as well as TV shows aired throughout the United States.

Aliens 
Ricco Ross originally read for the part of Corporal Hicks. He was then offered the role of Private Drake, but he turned it down in favour of appearing in Full Metal Jacket. However, James Cameron was so impressed with Ross' audition that he wrote the character of Frost specifically for him, and as a result Ross left Kubrick's production to appear in Aliens. In a 2014 interview for the podcast "I Was There Too", Ross stated that Private Frost's first name is actually Robert.

Filmography

Film

Television

Music Video

External links

Living people
20th-century American male actors
21st-century American male actors
Male actors from Chicago
American male film actors
American expatriate male actors in the United Kingdom
American male television actors
Florida Atlantic University alumni
University of California, Los Angeles alumni
African-American male actors
South Plantation High School alumni
20th-century African-American people
21st-century African-American people
Year of birth missing (living people)